Constantinople earthquake may refer to:
447 Constantinople earthquake
557 Constantinople earthquake
740 Constantinople earthquake
1509 Constantinople earthquake